The Lleida–La Pobla Line is a  railway line linking Lleida and La Pobla de Segur, in Catalonia, Spain. Most of its users concentrate between Lleida and Balaguer, where a frequent service is offered, with few trains continuing to La Pobla de Segur. Since 2009, a heritage railway service branded Tren dels Llacs (English: "Lakes Train"), in reference to the number of reservoirs skirted by the line north of Balaguer, has been running on the railway. The line is part of the ATM Àrea de Lleida fare-integrated public transport system between Lleida and Àger.

On 3 February 1924, the line's first stretch opened between Lleida and Balaguer, initially as part of a planned international rail line through the Pyrenees mountains between Lleida and Saint-Girons in France. Between 1949 and 1951, it was extended to the current northern terminus in La Pobla de Segur. The line was targeted for closure by the Spanish government in the 1980s, with great opposition from regional and local administrations. This led to the eventual transfer of the line to the Catalan government in 2004, though operations continued to be carried on by the national rail operator Renfe Operadora. In 2016, the line's operation was fully taken over by the regional company Ferrocarrils de la Generalitat de Catalunya (FGC) following the introduction of new rolling stock and service improvements.

References

Bibliography

External links

 
 Tren dels Llacs official website
 Information and photos of the line at trenscat.cat 
 

Railway lines in Catalonia
Iberian gauge railways
Transport in Segrià
Transport in Noguera (comarca)
Pallars Jussà
Transport in Lleida
Ferrocarrils de la Generalitat de Catalunya
Railway lines opened in 1924